Fred J. Scollay (March 19, 1923 – November 3, 2015) was an American character actor with dozens of credits in daytime and primetime television, as well as film and stage work

Early years and military service
Scollay was born in Roxbury, Massachusetts, and was "one of four orphaned Scollays." He was raised by Mr. and Mrs. James Murphy of Boston, Massachusetts. He studied acting at Emerson College and at Bishop-Lee Dramatic School.

Scollay was in the United States Navy during World War II, serving as an aviator machinist mate.

Television, film and stage
On daytime TV, Scollay was an original cast member of The Doctors, playing hospital chaplain Rev. Sam Shafer (1963-1964). From 1970 to 1971, he appeared on Somerset (TV series) as Harry Wilson (aka Ike Harding). On Another World (1977-1980), he played Charley Hobson, the last husband of Ada Hobson (Constance Ford). He also had smaller roles on several other soap operas.

In primetime, Scollay had roles dating back to the earliest days of television. He made numerous appearances in such programs as Studio One, Kraft Television Theatre, Armstrong Circle Theatre, Naked City, The Defenders, Dr. Kildare, and Gunsmoke, among many others. His last part was a recurring role as a judge on several episodes of Law & Order (1991-1996).

Scollay's work in motion pictures included A View from the Bridge, Odds Against Tomorrow, and Stage Struck.

Scollay's Broadway credits include The Devil's Advocate.

Death
Fred J. Scollay died on November 3, 2015, in Hobe Sound, Florida. His wife, Ann, predeceased him.

Filmography

References

External links

1923 births
2015 deaths
American male soap opera actors
American male television actors
People from Boston
People from Hobe Sound, Florida
United States Navy personnel of World War II